ITEC is an international examination board offering a variety of qualifications worldwide.

ITEC provides over 35 qualifications that are UK government accredited by the Office of the Qualifications and Examination Regulator (OFQUAL), on behalf of the Department for Innovation, Universities and Skills (DIUS), and are registered on the National Qualifications Framework in the UK. These ITEC qualifications attract funding from the Learning and Skills Council.

ITEC qualifications are supported by industry and are easily transportable nationally and internationally.

ITEC has ensured that best practice in the work place has been reflected in the syllabus for each qualification and each has been linked to the relevant job role, as well as ensuring that the syllabus reflects the required level of knowledge and skill needed for a practicing therapist.

The history of ITEC 
Dr William Arnould-Taylor founded the company in 1947. In 1973 it became known as ITEC. Jane Foulston (formerly a lecturer and International ITEC Examiner) took over as Director in 1998.

Jane has continued to develop the ITEC examination system which sets the highest standards of quality and education in the beauty, complementary and sports sectors. ITEC has strong links with employers worldwide who understand the level of knowledge and skills achieved by an ITEC qualified therapist.

Education in the United Kingdom